Matuail is located in Dhaka South City Corporation (DSCC), Ward no. 62(part), 63, 64, 65 & 66(part), Dhaka Division, Bangladesh. It is also located on the South side of Dhaka–Chittagong Highway and on the North side of Dhaka-Sylhet (Old Dhaka-Demra) Highway. Its geographical coordinates are 23° 43' 0" North, 90° 28' 0" East and its original name (with diacritics) is Mātuail. Its zip code is 1362.

References 
 Rahman, Papon, 2020. 

Populated places in Dhaka Division